Reedbuck is a common name for African antelopes from the genus Redunca. 

There are three recognised species of reedbuck:

Southern Reedbuck

Habitat and diet 
The Southern Reedbuck lives in the grasslands of Africa. They eat the vegetation on the grasslands, which is usually grass and reed shoots.

References

^